Nur-Ana "Lady Ann" Indanan Sahidulla is a Filipino politician. She was a representative of Sulu Province's 2nd congressional district in the Autonomous Region in Muslim Mindanao (ARMM) from 2010 to 2013. She is a close ally of Abdusakur Mahail Tan.

Personal life

"Lady Ann" was born September 21, 1959 in Pasil, Indanan, as the daughter of Sitti Rashidam Indanan and Omar Suhaili. She attended Rio Hondo Elementary School, Southern City Colleges High School in Zamboanga, and then received her Bachelor of Science in Commerce from Zamboanga AE Colleges, now Universidad de Zamboanga in 1980. She also received a Bachelor of Arts in Mass Communication in 1988 from Western Mindanao State University, Zamboanga City.

She is married to Abdulwahid O. Sahdulla, mayor of Banguingui, and is sister to Delna Indanan-Hassan who married ARMM Assemblyman Alhabsi Hassan. She has four children. She is a "professional" song composer and singer with her own band.

Political career

Sahidulla was the mayor of Banguingui Sulu for two consecutive terms from 1998 to 2004 and then went on to serve two terms as vice-governor of Sulu serving from 2004 to 2010. In 2010 she gave up the seat to Benjamin Loong, instead running as the representative from the 2nd District.

Lady Ann has a reputation as an advocate of peace and justice, and as a negotiator.  In 1995 she established the Anak Ilo Foundation, and since 2004 has been chairwoman of the Philippine National Red Cross, Sulu Chapter.

References

People from Sulu
Nationalist People's Coalition politicians
Members of the House of Representatives of the Philippines from Sulu
Women members of the House of Representatives of the Philippines
1959 births
Living people
Filipino songwriters
20th-century Filipino women singers
Filipino Muslims